Kathleen O'Neal Gear (born 1954) is an American archaeologist and writer. She has won numerous awards for her work, including the Spur Award for best historical novel of the west, and two Special Achievement Awards from the U.S. Dept. of the Interior for her work as an archaeologist. In 2015, she was honored by the United States Congress with a Certificate of Special Congressional Recognition. In 2021 she won the Owen Wister Award for lifetime contributions to western literature, and was inducted into the Western Writers Hall of Fame. Her novels have been published in 29 languages.

Biography
Gear was born in Tulare, California, and graduated with a B.A. from California State University, Bakersfield, then went on to do graduate work in archaeology at the Hebrew University of Jerusalem. She received her M.A. from California State University, Chico, and conducted Ph.D. studies in American Indian history at the University of California, Los Angeles.

Gear is a former state historian and archaeologist for Wyoming, Kansas, and Nebraska for the U.S. Department of the Interior. She has twice received the federal government's Special Achievement Award for "outstanding management" of America's cultural heritage, and has published fifty novels. In 2015, she was honored by the U.S. House of Representatives with a Certificate of Special Congressional Recognition, and the State of California passed Joint Member Resolution #117, saying, "The contributions of Kathleen O'Neal Gear to the fields of history, archaeology and writing have been invaluable..." She is perhaps best known for her North America's Forgotten Past series, co-authored with W. Michael Gear, her husband. She has eighteen million copies of her works in print, translated into twenty-nine languages.

Notable works

List from her personal web page.

People books – North America's Forgotten Past (with W. Michael Gear)

People of the Wolf (1990)
People of the Fire (1990)
People of the Earth (1992)
People of the River (1992)
People of the Sea (1993)
People of the Lakes (1994)
People of the Lightning (1995)
People of the Silence (1996)
People of the Mist (1997)
People of the Masks (1998)
People of the Owl (2003)
People of the Raven (2004)
People of the Moon (2005)
People of the Nightland (2007)
People of the Weeping Eye (2008)
People of the Thunder (2009)
People of the Longhouse (2010)
The Dawn Country (2011)
The Broken Land (2012)
People of the Black Sun (2012)
Copper Falcon (2014)--short story
People of the Morning Star (2014)
The Dead Man's Doll (2015)--short story
People of the Songtrail (2015)
Sun Born (2016)
Moon Hunt (2017)
Star Path (2019)
People of the Canyons (2020)
People of Cahokia: Lightning Shell (2022)

The Battle for America
 Coming of the Storm (2010) (with W. Michael Gear)
 Fire the Sky (2011) (with W. Michael Gear)
 A Searing Wind (2012) (with W. Michael Gear)

Powers of Light
 An Abyss of Light (1990)
 Treasure of Light (1990)
 Redemption of Light (1991)

Black Falcon Trilogy
 It Sleeps in Me (2005)
 It Wakes in Me (2006)
 It Dreams in Me (2007)

Anasazi mysteries (with W. Michael Gear)
 The Visitant (1999)
 The Summoning God (2000)
 Bone Walker (2001)

Other novels
 Sand in the Wind (1990)
 This Widowed Land (1993)
 Thin Moon and Cold Mist (1995)
 Dark Inheritance (2001) (with W. Michael Gear)
 Raising Abel (2002) (with W Michael Gear)
 The Betrayal: The Lost Life of Jesus (2008) (with W. Michael Gear)
 Children of the Dawnland (2009) (with W. Michael Gear)
 Der Eden Effect (2012) (with W. Michael Gear)
 Das Ende Aller Tag (2014) (with W. Michael Gear)
 Maze Master (2018)
 Cries from the Lost Island (2020)
 The Ice Lion (2021)
 The Foundation (2021)
 The Mourning War (2022)
 The Ice Ghost (2022)
 The Ice Orphan (2022)
 Fracture Event (2021)
 Rebel Hearts Anthology, Short Story, "No Quarter" (2022)

Selected non-fiction

 Does Social Media Sell Books?  The Case of the Viral Tweet, in Roundup Magazine, April, 2023.
 The New Bison Genome...and another DNA test: Our opinion, Bison Review Magazine, January, 2022. 
 PLC at Work and Your Small School, by Breez Longwell Daniels. Foreword by W. Michael Gear and Kathleen O'Neal Gear, Solution Tree Press, Bloomington, Indiana,2020.
 When Buffalo Cry, Roundup Magazine, February, 2020
 Meatless Meat. What's All the Fuss About? Bison Review, Winter, 2020
 The Power of an Illusion, Bison Review, Summer, 2019
 When Buffalo Cry, Bison Review, Winter, 2017.
 More on the Higgs Bison, Bison Review, Fall, 2016.
 Chunkey: America’s Ancient Game, Cobblestone, October, 2015.
 Morning Star and the Giants, Cobblestone, October, 2015.
 Are Bison Microsatellite DNA Tests Accurate? Bison Review, Winter, 2015.
 Cattle Genes in Bison: Modern or Ancient? Bison Review, Winter, 2015.
 The Dead Man’s Doll, Tor Books, April, 2015.
 Vikings in North America, Tor Books, March, 2015.
 A Prehistoric Bison Bone Sculpture. Bison Review, Summer, 2015.
 Viking Warrior Women: Did ‘Shieldmaidens’ like Lagertha Really Exist? Tor/Forge blog, May, 2015. (Tor.com)
 Wild Bison: The Search for a Definition of ‘Wild’ Behavior. Bison Review, Spring, 2014.
 Genetically Modified Bison? Let’s Not Find out if there is a Health Risk. Say NO to GMO. Bison Review, Fall, 2013.
 Chimps and Bison: The ESA Effect. Bison Review, Fall, 2013.
 The Healing Powers of Buffalo in Native America. Bison Review, Spring, 2013.
 Public Comments Letter from WBA to USFWS on Woods Bison Designation. Bison Review, Spring, 2013.
 Western Bison Association—Issues Paper: Conservation Herds vs. Commercial Herds. The Upcoming COSEWIC Report in Canada. Bison Review, Spring, 2013.
 Petition to Remove Wood Bison from Administration Under the Provisions of the Endangered Species Act. Bison Review, Winter, 2012.
 Hybrids and the Endangered Species Act, Bison Review, Winter, 2012.
 Cattle Genes in Bison: The Perspectives of the WBA. Bison Review, Fall, 2012.
 The Effects of Cattle DNA in Bison: A New Study. Bison Review, Fall, 2012.
 The Global Economic Crises and Food Production: What’s in Store? Bison Review, Fall, 2012.
 Response to Canadian Perspectives. Bison Review, Fall, 2012.
 New change to the NBA Code of Ethics—Our opinion, Bison Review, May, 2012.
 Terminology: Bison bison or Bos bison. What does it mean for us? Bison Review, May, 2012.
 Ranchers Efforts to Protect Endangered Species Foiled by Conservation Groups. Bison Review, May, 2012.
 Historical Uses of Bison. Bison Review, May, 2012.
 Hybrids and the Endangered Species Act. Bison Review, Winter, 2012.
 Western Bison Association’s Petition to Remove Wood Bison from Administration Under the Endangered Species Act. Bison Review, Winter, 2012.
 2011 WBA Conference Overview. Bison Review, Winter, 2012.
 Gene Patents: Why the Bison Industry Needs a Plan for the Bison Genome. Bison Review, Fall, 2011.
 Paleobiology of Bison, Dakota Territory Buffalo Association Newsletter, Summer, 2011.
 The Pure Bison Debate, Dakota Territory Buffalo Association Newsletter, Summer, 2011.
 Western Bison Association Response to Conservation Committee on Proposed Conservation Guidelines for Herd Managers. Bison Review, May, 2011.
 The Buffalo Primer: An Introduction to the Art and Science of Owning Bison. Part 7. Bison Review, May, 2011.
 Principles of Evolutionary Biology – and What They Mean for the Purity Issue in Bison, Dakota Territory Buffalo Association Newsletter, Summer, 2011.
 Summary of 12th Annual Stampede, Bison Review, January, 2011.
 Possible Impacts of ‘Pure Bison’ Debate, Bison Review, January, 2011.
 Pure Bison—WBA Management Recommendations, Bison Review, January 2011.
 Western Bison Association Response to Conservation Committee on Proposed Conservation Guidelines for Herd Managers. Bison Review, May, 2011.
 The Buffalo Primer: An Introduction to the Art and Science of Owning Bison. Part 6. Bison Review, January, 2011.
 Basic Principles of Evolutionary Biology – and What they Mean for the Purity Issue. Bison Review, Jan. 2011.
 Response to James Derr, Bison Review, January, 2011.
 Lessons from Ancient Egypt. Bison World Magazine, June, 2010. 
 One Bison Skull Helps Rewrite Bison History. The Bison Review, Summer, 2010.
 Lessons from Ancient Egypt. Bison Review, January 2010.
 The Buffalo Primer: An Introduction to the Art and Science of Owning Bison. Part 5. Nutrition. Bison Review, January, 2010. 
 The Buffalo Primer: An Introduction to the Art and Science of Owning Bison. Part 4.Bison Review, Fall, 2009.
 The Buffalo Primer: An Introduction to the Art and Science of Owning Buffalo. Part 3: Buying Buffalo. Bison Review, May, 2009.
 How do the Judges Do it? Bison Review, May, 2009.
 The Buffalo Primer: An Introduction to the Art and Science of Owning Buffalo. Part 2. Bison Review, Fall, 2008.
 Do we really want Bison to be Amenable? Dakota Territory Buffalo Association Newsletter, Fall, 2008.
 Should Bison be an Amenable Species? The Bison Rancher, Fall, 2008.
 The Buffalo Primer: An Introduction to the Art and Science of Owning Buffalo. Part 1.Bison Review, Summer, 2008.
 The Horsemen of the Apocalypse: Long Version, Bison Review, Summer, 2008.
 Do We Really Want Bison to be an Amenable Species? Bison Review, Summer, 2008. 
 The Horsemen of the Apocalypse, Bison World Magazine, Spring, 2008.
 The Drought, Global Warming, and Our Own Backyards, Western Bison Record, March, 2007.
 Medicinal Usages of Plants by Buffalo. Western Bison Record, November, 2006.
 Prehistoric Sexual Healing Rituals, Romantic Times magazine, May, 2005.
 The Oregon Trail: The Beginning of the End for the Buffalo, Western Bison Record, June, 2005.
 Slipper: The Saga of a Buffalo Bottle-Baby. Western Bison Record, March, 2004.
 Tripping through the Mine Field: Writing Fiction about Archaeology, The Archaeological Record, November, 2003.
 From Cowboy to Buffalero: Wyoming Buffalo Ranchers Talk About the Industry, Western Farm, Ranch, and Dairy Magazine, September, 2003.
 Thirty-three Books, Co-Authors and Still Lovers? Romantic Times Magazine, Aug. 2001.
 Bone Walker and The Anasazi Mystery Series. Mystery Readers Journal, 2001.
 Wagon Wheels, by Candy Moulton and Ben Kern, High Plains Press, 1996. Forewords by Kathleen O'Neal Gear.
 The Sawyers Expedition Wagon Road, True West Magazine, 1988.
 The Female Advantage, Outdoor Life Magazine, 1988.
 Women and Big Game Hunting, Outdoor Life Magazine, 1987.
 Arapahoe Politics: 1851-1978, Book Review in the Annals of Wyoming, Fall, 1985.
 Resource Area Management Plan, Newcastle, Cultural Resources section. Published the by U.S. Dept. of the Interior, Bureau of Land Management, 1986.
 Federal Coal Team: Resources Management Report, Cultural Resources section. Published by the U.S. Dept. of the Interior, BLM, 1985.
 Resource Area Management Plan for the Buffalo Resource Area, Cultural Resources section. Published by U.S. Dept. of the Interior, BLM, 1984.
 Historic Preservation and Energy Development. Journal of Western Planners, Spring, 1983.
 Slim Buttes, 1876: An Episode in the Great Sioux War, Book Review in the Wyoming Library Journal, Vol. 38, No. 1, Fall, 1982.
 Empires in the Sun: The Rise of the New American West, Book Review in the Wyoming Library Journal, Vol. 38, No. 1, Fall, 1982.
 The Peace Chiefs of the Cheyenne, Book Review in the Annals of Wyoming, Vol. 53, No. 1, Spring, 1981.
 Grave Robbers: Protecting America’s Past. Pamphlet published by the U.S. Dept. of the Interior, 1981.
 An Historic Walking Tour of Cheyenne, Wyoming. Published by the City of Cheyenne, 1981.
 The History of Cheyenne, Wyoming. Booklet published by the City of Cheyenne, Wyoming, 1980.

Awards and honors

List from her personal web page:

1968. Gold Medal, American Legion Essay Contest, Tipton Elementary School, Tipton, California.
1975 American Bible Society Scholar Award
1976 American Bible Society Scholar Award
1995. Publishers Weekly selected Thin Moon and Cold Mist, by Kathleen O’Neal Gear, as one of the Top Five Romances of the Year.
1998. Arizola Magnenat Award (with W. Michael Gear) for encouraging other Wyoming Writers, Wyoming Writers Association.
1998 – People of the Mist, by Kathleen O’Neal Gear and W. Michael Gear, selected as winner of Booklist’s Editor’s Choice Award for “Best Adult Novel for Young Adults.”
1999 Emmie Mygatt Award for dedicated service and commitment to Wyoming Writers Association.
2000 – Outstanding Alumna, School of Arts and Sciences, California State University, Bakersfield.
2000 – The Summoning God, by Kathleen O’Neal Gear and W. Michael Gear, selected as one of the Top Ten Books of the Southwest by the Pima County Library Association.
2001 – Bone Walker, by Kathleen O’Neal Gear and W. Michael Gear, selected as one of the Top Ten Books of the Southwest by the Pima County Library Association.
2001 – Western Writers of America “President’s Award” for dedicated service to the organization.
2003 – Western Writers of America “President’s Award” for dedicated service to WWA.
2004 – Western Writers of America “President’s Award” for dedicated service to WWA.
2004 – National Bison Association, "Producer of the Year Award."
2005 – Western Writers of America “President’s Award” for dedicated service to WWA.
2005 – People of the Raven, by Kathleen O’Neal Gear and W. Michael Gear, winner of the Spur Award for the “Best Novel of the West,” Western Writers of America.
2005 – Kathleen O’Neal Gear inducted into the Women Who Write the West Hall of Fame.
2006 – Western Writers of America “President’s Award” for dedicated service to WWA.
2006 – People of the Moon, Spur Award finalist, “Best Novel of the West,” Western Writers of America.
2007 – Western Writers of America “President’s Award” for dedicated service to WWA.
2007 – Kathleen O’Neal Gear and W. Michael Gear receive the “Literary Contribution Award” from the Mountain Plains Library Association.
2007 – FFA Pride Award for agricultural education.
2008 – Western Writers of America “President’s Award” for dedicated service to WWA.
2009 – Children of the Dawnland, “Top Choice Award,” Flamingnet.
2009 – National Bison Association, "Producer of the Year Award."
2009 – Dakota Territory Buffalo Association, "Classic Producer's Award."
2009 – Wisconsin Bison Producers Association, "Producer of the Year Award."
2010 – Children of the Dawnland selected by the Kansas National Education Association for the Kansas State Reading Circle for Middle/Junior High School students.
2011 – People of the Masks, Massachusetts Public Library's Readers Connection – They Came Before Us Selection.
2012 – Founders' Award (with W. Michael Gear) from the Western Bison Association
2012 – Special Award from the Western Bison Association for "dedicated service to the bison industry."
2013 – The Broken Land selected as the Norfolk Public Library's American Indian Heritage Month Booklist Selection
2015 – Kathleen O’Neal Gear inducted into the California State University, Bakersfield, Hall of Fame. https://www.csub.edu/alumni/AlumniEvents/HallOfFame/PastAwardees/index.html
2015 – Kathleen O’Neal Gear was honored by the United States House of Representatives with a “Certificate of Special Congressional Recognition.”
2015 – “Certificate of Recognition,” Kern County, California, Board of Supervisors.
2015 – California State Legislature, Joint Member Resolution No. 117: “The contributions of Kathleen O’Neal Gear to the fields of history, archaeology and writing have been invaluable…"
2018 – Moon Hunt selected as a finalist for the Spur Award in the Best Western Historical Novel category, Western Writers of America
2019 – International Book Award for “Best Science Fiction” novel: Maze Master.
2021 – The Owen Wister Award for lifetime achievement in Western literature https://www.prnewswire.com/news-releases/w-michael-and-kathleen-oneal-gear-to-receive-western-writers-of-americas-owen-wister-award-301215490.html
2021 - Kathleen O'Neal Gear inducted into the Western Writers Hall of Fame
2021 - International Book Award for Best Young Adult novel: Cries From the Lost Island.
2022 - President's Award, Western Writers of America.
2023 - Spur Award for "Best Short Fiction" of the year for "No Quarter," published in the Rebel Hearts Anthology, 2022, Wolfpack Publishing. https://www.wboy.com/business/press-releases/ein-presswire/619719903/western-writers-of-america-announces-2023-spur-award-winners-and-finalists/

References

External links
Biography of Kathleen O'Neal Gear on her official website

1954 births
Living people
20th-century American novelists
21st-century American historians
21st-century American novelists
21st-century American short story writers
21st-century American women writers
American archaeologists
American historical novelists
Writers of fiction set in prehistoric times
California State University, Chico alumni
People from Thermopolis, Wyoming
People from Cody, Wyoming
American non-fiction writers
American women historians
American women novelists
American women short story writers
American women archaeologists
Women historical novelists
Novelists from Wyoming
20th-century American women writers